Interdata, Inc., was a computer company, founded in 1966 by a former Electronic Associates engineer, Daniel Sinnott, and was based in Oceanport, New Jersey. The company produced a line of 16- and 32-bit minicomputers that were loosely based on the IBM 360 instruction set architecture but at a cheaper price. In 1974, it produced one of the first 32-bit minicomputers, the Interdata 7/32. The company then used the parallel processing approach, where multiple tasks were performed at the same time, making real-time computing a reality.

Some real-time applications Interdata computers were used for included: Core Protection Calculator, used in some later Combustion Engineering designed nuclear power plants; lottery systems manufactured by GTech; the NexRad weather radar system. Many companies used them for internal high speed laboratory data capture, such as United Technologies Research Center in East Hartford, Connecticut wind  tunnel, General Electric R&D in Schenectady, New York, and Perkin-Elmer in Connecticut (which later acquired Interdata).

The operating system for the 16-bit computers was called OS/16, and for the 32-bit computers OS/32. The assembly language could generate series independent object code. Later, as with Gould, SEL, Modcomp and other real time competitors, they offered a 32-bit time sharing system called MTM (Mutli Terminal Monitor).

Acquisitions
In 1973, it was purchased by Perkin-Elmer Corporation, a Connecticut-based producer of scientific instruments for $63.6 million. Interdata was already making $19 million in annual sales but this merger made Perkin-Elmer's annual sales rise to over $200 million. Interdata then became the basis for Perkin-Elmer's Data Systems Group. In 1985, the computing division of Perkin-Elmer was spun off as Concurrent Computer Corporation.

List of products

 Interdata Model 1 – 1970
 Interdata Model 3 – 1967
 Interdata 4 (autoload, floating point) 
 Interdata 5 (list processing, microcoded automatic I/O channel) 
 Interdata 70 (1971), 74 (1973), 80 (1971), 85 (Writable Control Store, 1973)
 Interdata 50, 55 (Communications systems)
 Interdata 5/16, 6/16, 7/16 (1974)
 Interdata 8/16, 8/16e (double precision floating point, extended memory) 
 Interdata RD-800 and RD-850 – 1975
 Interdata 7/32 – 1974
 Interdata 8/32 – 1975
 Perkin-Elmer 3205, 3210, 3220, 3230, 3240, 3250, 3280

A simulator is available: http://simh.trailing-edge.com/interdata.html

References

External links
 interdata.org.uk – Site detailing the restoration of an Interdata Model 74 computer
 http://www.computinghistory.org.uk/det/28933/Interdata-Model-70-Users-Manual/ Model-70 User's Manual

Companies based in Monmouth County, New Jersey
Minicomputers